LIFO may refer to:

Last In First Out
 FIFO and LIFO accounting, in accounting
 Stack (abstract data type), in computing, a collection data structure providing last-in-first-out semantics; also called a LIFO queue
 LIFO (education), a layoff policy

LIFO (magazine)
 Lifo (magazine), a Greek weekly freesheet

See also
 FIFO (disambiguation)